The 2008 International League season was the 125th season of the Triple-A International League. It took place between April and September 2008.

In the semifinal playoff rounds, the Scranton/Wilkes-Barre Yankees defeated the Pawtucket Red Sox 3-1 and the Durham Bulls defeated the Louisville Bats 3-1.  The Scranton/Wilkes-Barre Yankees defeated the Durham Bulls 3-1 in the championship series to win the Governors' Cup.

Attendance

Final regular season standings

North Division

Pawtucket clinched the wild card berth.

South Division

West Division

Playoffs
The following teams qualified for the postseason:  Durham Bulls, Louisville Bats, Pawtucket Red Sox, and Scranton/Wilkes-Barre Yankees.

Scranton played in the Triple A Championship Game but lost to the defending champions, the Sacramento River Cats. This marks the first time a defending champion successfully defended its title.

References

External links
International League official website 

International League seasons